James Bissett is a Canadian former diplomat.

James Bissett may also refer to:

Jimmy Bissett (1898 – after 1932), Scottish footballer
James Bissett (Royal Navy officer), in Battle of Jean-Rabel

See also
James Bissett Pratt (1875–1944), American philosopher